The Chipettes are a group of three female anthropomorphic chipmunk singers: Brittany, Jeanette and Eleanor who first appeared on the cartoon series Alvin and the Chipmunks in 1983. In this and related materials, the Chipettes served as female featured characters in their own right, starring in numerous episodes. The title of the show was changed from Alvin and the Chipmunks to simply The Chipmunks in 1988 to reflect this. In the cartoon series and the accompanying feature films, all of the Chipettes were voiced by their creator, Janice Karman, the wife of Ross Bagdasarian Jr. (son of Ross Bagdasarian Sr. who created The Chipmunks). Karman also wrote and voiced the Chipettes' dialogue on their studio albums, while studio singers such as Susan Boyd, Shelby Daniel and Katherine Coon provided their singing voices. In Alvinnn!!! and the Chipmunks, Eleanor is voiced by Vanessa Bagdasarian, the daughter of Ross Bagdasarian Jr. and Janice Karman and wife of Brian Chambers.

The first designs for the Chipettes were drafted by Corny Cole for their 1983 cartoon series debut. These designs were later revamped by Sandra Berez for The Chipmunk Adventure and the later seasons of the show.

Origins
The origins of the Chipettes can be traced to the 1982 Alvin and the Chipmunks album The Chipmunks Go Hollywood. On this album, Alvin sings a duet with a female character billed as Charlene the Chipette. Charlene is featured on the song "You're the One That I Want" from the soundtrack of the motion picture Grease. Charlene was depicted on the album cover as having a long, golden blonde ponytail, and seems to have been the basis for the later character of Brittany. Janice Karman said in interviews that she created the Chipettes because she and Bagdasarian Jr. couldn't do girl songs and wanted Chipmunks who are females and have counter personalities of the main three Chipmunks. The first Chipette she created was Brittany in 1982.

The Chipettes, redesigned as far more realistic chipmunks, appear in the 2009 film Alvin and the Chipmunks: The Squeakquel. In the movie, Christina Applegate, Anna Faris, and Amy Poehler voice the Chipettes. "There has been a lot of talk about it," noted Janice Karman, one of the film's producers. "A lot of people have been asking about the little girls." Applegate, Faris, and Poehler reprised their respective roles in Alvin and the Chipmunks: Chipwrecked, which was released on December 16, 2011. The Chipettes also appeared in Alvin and the Chipmunks: The Road Chip; Applegate and Faris again voice Brittany and Jeanette, but Kaley Cuoco replaces Poehler as the voice of Eleanor.

Discography
With the exception of 1987's The Chipmunk Adventure soundtrack (LP) and 1988's The Chipmunks and The Chipettes: Born to Rock, the discography of The Chipettes consists of featured appearances on Alvin and the Chipmunks recordings.

Albums
1982: The Chipmunks Go Hollywood
1984: Songs from Our TV Shows
1987: The Chipmunk Adventure
1988: The Chipmunks and The Chipettes: Born to Rock
1988: Solid Gold Chipmunks: 30 Years of Great Hits
1990: Rockin' Through the Decades
1991: The Chipmunks Rock the House
1992: Chipmunks in Low Places
1994: Here's Looking at Me! 35 Years of Chipmunk Classics
1994: A Very Merry Chipmunk
1995: When You Wish Upon a Chipmunk
1996: Club Chipmunk: The Dance Mixes
1998: The A-Files: Alien Songs
2004: Little Alvin and the Mini-Munks
2009: Alvin and the Chipmunks: The Squeakquel: Original Motion Picture Soundtrack
2011: Alvin and the Chipmunks: Chipwrecked: Music from the Motion Picture
2015: We're the Chipmunks (Music From the TV Show)
2015: Alvin and the Chipmunks: The Road Chip: Original Motion Picture Soundtrack

Singles
1994: "I Don't Want To Be Alone For Christmas (Unless I'm Alone With You)"
1996: "Macarena (with Alvin and the Chipmunks/Love Shack (with Alvin and the Chipmunks)"

2009
"Put Your Records On" 
"Hot n Cold" 
"Single Ladies (Put a Ring on It)" 
"So What" 
"The Song" (feat. Queensberry)
"No One" (feat. Jake Zyrus)

2011
"Whip My Tail" 
"We No Speak Americano"/"Conga" (feat. Barnetta Dafonseca)
"Survivor" 
"SOS" 
"Hello"

2012
"Witch Doctor 2.0"

2022
"Stay The Night" (recorded by Eleanor)

Filmography
Alvin and the Chipmunks (1983–1990) – TV series
Alvin and the Chipmunks and the Amazing Computer (1985) – Stage Show
 The 1986 Macy's Thanksgiving Day Parade
The Chipmunk Adventure (1987)
Rockin' Through the Decades (1990)
Alvin and the Chipmunks Meet the Wolfman (2000)
Little Alvin and the Mini-Munks (2004)
Alvin and the Chipmunks: The Squeakquel (2009)
Alvin and the Chipmunks: Chipwrecked (2011)
Alvin and the Chipmunks (2015–present) – TV series
Alvin and the Chipmunks: The Road Chip (2015)

Personnel
Brittany Miller – lead and backing vocals
Jeanette Miller – lead and backing vocals
Eleanor Miller – lead and backing vocals

References

Sources

 Regarding the first and subsequent appearances of the Chipettes on television — https://web.archive.org/web/20080707060026/http://www.tv.com/alvin-and-the-chipmunks/show/2827/episode.html
 Regarding Janice Karman as the primary voice actress for the Chipettes —https://web.archive.org/web/20121106104019/http://www.tv.com/shows/alvin-and-the-chipmunks/cast/
 Regarding the history of the Chipettes on The Chipmunks TV series and in the Chipmunk Adventure — https://web.archive.org/web/20120213135927/http://www.chipmunks.com/history.php
 Regarding the Chipettes creation for the musical medium and their discography — https://web.archive.org/web/20060821114324/http://www.roctober.com/roctober/chipmunks.html
 Janice Karman on the possibility of the Chipettes appearing in a sequel to the recent Alvin and the Chipmunks film — http://moviesblog.mtv.com/2008/01/09/alvin-the-chipmunks-to-meet-chipettes-in-sequel/
 Regarding the fictional character history of the Chipettes as outlined in various episodes of the television series —  https://web.archive.org/web/20080707060026/http://www.tv.com/alvin-and-the-chipmunks/show/2827/episode.html

External links
The Official Site

Alvin and the Chipmunks
Child musical groups
Family musical groups
Fictional chipmunks
Fictional female musicians
Fictional musical groups
Fictional singers
Fictional triplets
RCA Records artists
Columbia Records artists
Atlantic Records artists
Rhino Records artists
Animated musical groups
Television characters introduced in 1983
Video game musicians
Child characters in animated films
Child characters in animated television series
Teenage characters in film
Female characters in animation
Female characters in television